Mayda Navarro (born 22 August 1975) is a Mexican figure skater. She competed in the ladies' singles event at the 1992 Winter Olympics finishing in 29th place.

References

1975 births
Living people
Mexican female single skaters
Olympic figure skaters of Mexico
Figure skaters at the 1992 Winter Olympics
Place of birth missing (living people)